Maclain Way is an American documentary film director and producer. He is best known for producing the Netflix documentary series Untold, directing Wild Wild Country and The Battered Bastards of Baseball.

Maclain received the Primetime Emmy Award for Outstanding Documentary or Nonfiction Series for Wild Wild Country in 2018.

Life and career
Maclain was born and raised in Ventura County, California. He attended UCLA, where he studied history and documentary film. He is a grandson of actor Bing Russell and nephew of actor Kurt Russell.

Maclain directed and produced his debut documentary, The Battered Bastards of Baseball, along with his brother Chapman Way.  The film told the story of the Portland Mavericks and premiered at the 2014 Sundance Film Festival, where it was acquired and later released by Netflix as one of their first original documentary films. In 2018, he directed a documentary series, Wild Wild Country, along with Chapman Way for Netflix about the controversial guru Bhagwan Shree Rajneesh (Osho). In 2021, he produced the Netflix documentary series "Untold" and directed Untold: Crimes and Penalties and Untold: Breaking Point, along with Chapman Way.

Filmography

Awards and nominations

References

External links
 

Living people
American documentary film directors
American documentary film producers
Year of birth missing (living people)
People from California